PGR may stand for:

 the stock ticker symbol for the Progressive Corporation, an American insurance company
 Patriot Guard Riders, an American organization of motorcyclists whose members attend military funeral services to prevent protestors from interfering and to honor the dead soldier
 Państwowe Gospodarstwo Rolne, a state-owned farm in communist Poland
 Philosophical Gourmet Report, a survey-based ranking of philosophy departments
 The Attorney General of Mexico (Procuraduría General de la República)
 Progressive Rail 
 Project Gotham Racing, a racing video game series
 Project Gotham Racing (video game), the second video game in the series
 Per Grazia Ricevuta, an Italian rock band with former members of Consorzio Suonatori Indipendenti
 PGR, a stage name of  American composer Kim Cascone
 Project Green Reach, a science-based school outreach program that is run by the Brooklyn Botanic Garden
 Plant hormone – plant growth regulator
 Progesterone receptor, a protein
 Postgraduate research
 a television content rating level used in New Zealand (and previously used in Australia) – see TV Parental Guidelines
 Post-glacial rebound
 Punishing: Gray Raven, a mobile game